Eagle Lake is a 180-acre lake in the Adirondacks of New York. Eagle Lake is part of the Eckford Chain, and is the central lake of the chain, with Blue Mountain Lake and Utowana Lake. It is the site of Eagle Nest camp, a historic Adirondack Great Camp built in 1937.

Fishing
Fish species present in Eagle Lake are lake trout, white sucker, sunfish, black bullhead, atlantic salmon, yellow perch, and smallmouth bass. Access by channel from Utowana Lake or Blue Mountain Lake.

References

Lakes of New York (state)
Lakes of Hamilton County, New York